Mégan Laurent (born 24 March 1992) is a Belgian footballer who plays for Luxembourger club Jeunesse Esch as a winger.

External links

1992 births
Living people
Belgian footballers
Belgium youth international footballers
Association football midfielders
K.R.C. Mechelen players
R.A.E.C. Mons players
A.F.C. Tubize players
Lierse S.K. players
K.A.S. Eupen players
Jeunesse Esch players
Belgian Pro League players
Challenger Pro League players
Luxembourg National Division players
Belgian expatriate footballers
Expatriate footballers in Luxembourg
Belgian expatriate sportspeople in Luxembourg